USS Yankee Hero was an American sloop-of-war commissioned in Massachusetts on January 13, 1776, for use by the new Continental Navy. It was under the command of Captain James Tracy until it was captured by the British on June 7, 1776.

As USS Yankee Hero

Captain Tracy and a small crew left Newburyport for Boston to take on a full crew for a six-month patrol. As the ship rounded Cape Ann, they spotted another sail. As the Yankee Hero was short-handed, Tracy decided to let it pass. However, some local sailors rendezvoused with them at sea and told them that several transports had been seen close to the Cape that day. Supplemented with fourteen of the local men, bringing his crew to 40 (other accounts say 52), Tracy set after the distant ship. When they had approached to within six miles, they could see that it was a ship of war, HMS Milford. Still short-handed and ill-prepared for a fight, the Captain changed his mind again and ordered the ship around. However, the Milford had spotted them by this time and gave chase. Heavily outgunned and outmanned, the Yankee Hero's crew was decimated and the ship disabled. At least four of the crew were killed and thirteen wounded, including Captain Tracy.

Considering the great difference in capabilities of the two ships (the Americans had 14 guns, while the British had 32 guns), the Yankee Hero and her crew fought well for two hours before Tracy ordered the colors struck.

As HMS Postillion

The Yankee Hero was refitted by the British and recommissioned as HMS Postillion in August 1776. Richard Frothingham, in his History of the Siege of Boston, stated that the Yankee Hero was among the vessels that the British stationed at Nantasket after evacuating Boston in March 1776, but that is probably incorrect since the British did not have possession of her until almost three months later.

References

External links
  Massachusetts Privateer Brig Yankee Hero 
  The Naval History of the United States, by Willis J. Abbot
  "Privateer Yankee Hero", Essex Journal, August 22, 1776

Ships of the Continental Navy
Ships built in Hingham, Massachusetts
1770s ships
Captured ships